The banded-fin flounder or spotted flounder, Azygopus pinnifasciatus, is a righteye flounder and the only species in the genus Azygopus.

References

 
 Tony Ayling & Geoffrey Cox, Collins Guide to the Sea Fishes of New Zealand,  (William Collins Publishers Ltd, Auckland, New Zealand 1982) 

Pleuronectidae

Fish described in 1926